

General classification

References

Giro di Lombardia
1945 in Italian sport
1945 in road cycling